Say One for Me is a soundtrack album issued by Columbia Records (CL 1337) from the film of the same name. See Say One for Me for the film. The film starred Bing Crosby, Debbie Reynolds, Robert Wagner and Ray Walston.  Lionel Newman conducted the musical backing for the film and he was nominated for an Oscar for "Best Scoring of a Musical Picture" but was unsuccessful. All the songs were written by Jimmy Van Heusen (music) and Sammy Cahn (lyrics). The version of "The Secret of Christmas" included on the album was not the one from the actual film. The soundtrack version had Robert Wagner and Debbie Reynolds joining Bing for a few lines. Instead, Bing recorded the song again on March 25, 1959 with Frank De Vol and his Orchestra.

The entire album was included in the Sepia Records CD "The Road to Hong Kong / Say One for Me" (Sepia 1216) issued in 2013.

Reception
The film itself was not very well received and neither was the album. The British publication The Gramophone commenting: "Say One for Me is abysmal. Even Bing Crosby can’t get away with numbers like ‘The Secret of Christmas' and it sounds as if he’s not really trying to on this occasion. The rest is substandard rock ‘n’ roll, a couple of mildewed ballads and the inevitable cha-cha for Debbie Reynolds and Robert Wagner."

Track listing

References 

1959 soundtrack albums
Bing Crosby soundtracks
Columbia Records soundtracks